Oliver Grüner (born 12 March 1966) is a German rower. He competed in the men's quadruple sculls event at the 1988 Summer Olympics.

References

1966 births
Living people
German male rowers
Olympic rowers of West Germany
Rowers at the 1988 Summer Olympics
Rowers from Frankfurt